The Central District of Chaharbagh County is in Alborz province, Iran. At the latest census in 2016, the district's constituent parts were in the former Chaharbagh District of Savojbolagh County, before the establishment of Chaharbagh County in 2019.

References 

Districts of Alborz Province

Populated places in Alborz Province

fa:بخش مرکزی شهرستان چهارباغ